Sri Lanka is a tropical island situated close to the southern tip of India. It is situated in the middle of Indian Ocean. Because of being an island, Sri Lanka has many endemic freshwater fauna, including fish, crabs, molluscs, and other aquatic insects.

Species List
Class: Actinopterygii

Freshwater fish are physiologically differ from marine and brackish water forms. The low salinity and high osmotic pressure makes them so different. Few fish can be found in all three ecological systems.

There are 95 species of freshwater fish occur in the country, where 53 of those are endemic. 41% of all known species of fish of Sri Lanka are found in freshwater. There are about 70% of endemism of those fish. Most of them are listed into IUCN categories. Four Devario species were described in 2017 by Batuwita et al. However, the taxonomy and descriptions were cited as problematic by fellow local ichthyologists.

Note: introduced species are not included in the list. Go to List of introduced fish in Sri Lanka.

Freshwater eels
Order: Anguilliformes. Family: Anguillidae

There are 19 species and 6 subspecies in this family are all in genus Anguilla. Sri Lanka is home for 2 freshwater eels.

Carps and allies
Order: Cypriniformes. Family: Cyprinidae
About over 320 genera, and more than 3,250 species are included in this family. 52 species found in Sri Lanka.

River loaches

Family: Balitoridae

True Loaches

Family: Cobitidae

Naked catfishes

Order: Siluriformes. Family: Bagridae

Sheat catfishes

Family: Siluridae

Airbreathing catfishes

Family: Clariidae

Airsac catfishes

Family: Heteropneustidae

Swamp eels

Order: Synbranchiformes. Family: Synbranchidae

Rivulines

Order: Cyprinodontiformes. Family: Aplocheilidae

Ricefish

Family: Adrianichthyidae

Cichlids

Order: Perciformes. Family: Cichlidae

Climbing perches

Family: Anabantidae

Gourami

Family: Osphronemidae

Snakeheads

Family: Channidae

Garfishes

Family: Belonidae

Sleeper gobies

Family: Eleotridae

Spiny eels

Family: Mastacembelidae

Gobies

Family: Gobiidae

References

 https://web.archive.org/web/20150209130058/http://www.fish.lk/
 http://www.environmentmin.gov.lk/web/images/pdf/freshwater%20fish.pdf
 http://slendemics.net/easl/fish/Endemic%20fish%20page.html

 
Freshwater fish
Sri Lanka